This is a list of the oldest existing universities in continuous operation in the world. 

Inclusion in this list is determined by the date at which the educational institute first met the traditional definition of a university used by academic historians although it may have existed as a different kind of institution before that time. This definition limits the term "university" to institutions with distinctive structural and legal features that developed in Europe, and which make the university form different from other institutions of higher learning in the pre-modern world, even though these may sometimes now be referred to popularly as universities. To be included in the list below, the university must have been founded before 1500 in Europe or be the oldest university derived from the medieval European model in a country or region. It must also be still in operation, with institutional continuity retained throughout its history. So some early universities, including the University of Paris, founded around the beginning of the 13th century but abolished by the French Revolution in 1793, are excluded. Some institutions reemerge, but with new foundations, such as the modern University of Paris, which came into existence in 1896 after the Louis Liard law disbanded Napoleon's University of France system.

The University of Bologna in Bologna, Italy, where teaching began around 1088 and which was organised into a university in the late twelfth century, is the world's oldest university in continuous operation, and the first university in the sense of a higher-learning and degree-awarding institute. The origin of many medieval universities can be traced back to the Catholic cathedral schools or monastic schools, which appeared as early as the 6th century and were run for hundreds of years as such before their formal establishment as universities in the high medieval period.

Ancient higher-learning institutions, such as those of ancient Greece, ancient Persia, ancient Rome, Byzantium, ancient China, ancient India and the Islamic world, are not included in this list owing to their cultural, historical, structural and legal differences from the medieval European university from which the modern university evolved.

Medieval origins 

The university as an institution was historically rooted in medieval society, which it in turn influenced and shaped. Academic historian Walter Rüegg asserts that:

Modern spread 
From the early modern period onwards, the university spread from the medieval Latin West across the globe, eventually replacing all other higher-learning institutions and becoming the preeminent institution for higher education everywhere. The process occurred in the following chronological order:
 Southern and Western Europe (from the 11th or 12th century)
 Central and Northern Europe (from the 14th or 15th century)
 Americas (from the 16th century)
 Australia (from the 19th century)
 Asia and Africa (from the 19th or 20th century), with the exception of the Philippines, where the University of Santo Tomas was established in the 17th century.

Founded as universities before 1500 

This list includes medieval universities that were founded before 1500 and which have retained institutional continuity since then (excluding not only those that ceased to exist, but also those that merged into or split away to an institution which is regarded as newly established). Several of these have been closed for brief periods: for example the University of Siena was closed 18051815 during the Napoleonic wars, and non-German speaking universities in the Czech Republic and Poland were closed during Nazi occupation, 1939–1945.

Universities are dated from when, according to scholars, they first met the definition of a university. In cases such as the universities of Bologna and Oxford which trace their history back to teaching in individual schools prior to their formation into a university, or which existed in another form prior to being a university, the date in the list below is thus later than the date given by the institutions for their foundation.

Oldest universities by country or region after 1500 still in operation 
The majority of European countries had universities by 1500. Many universities were established at institutes of learning such as schools and colleges that may have been founded significantly earlier but were not classed as universities upon their foundation; this is normally described in the notes for that institution. In some countries (particularly the US and those influenced by its culture), degree-granting higher education institutions that would normally be called universities are instead called colleges, in this case both the oldest institution that would normally be regarded as a university and the oldest institution (if different) to actually be called a university are given. In many parts of the world the first university to have a presence was an institution based elsewhere (often the University of London via the affiliation of a local college); where this is different from the first locally established university both are given.

Africa

Asia

Europe 
While Europe had 143 universities in 1789, the French Revolutionary and Napoleonic Wars took a heavy toll, reducing the number to 83 by 1815. The universities of France were abolished and over half of the universities in both Germany and Spain were destroyed. By the mid 19th century, Europe had recovered to 98 universities.

Latin America and the Caribbean

North America 

In the United States, the colonial colleges awarded degrees from their foundation, but none were formally named as universities prior to the American Revolution, leading to various claims to be the first university in the United States. The earliest Canadian institutions were founded as colleges, without degree awarding powers, and gained degree granting authority and university status later.

Oceania

See also 
 List of oldest Islamic seminaries
 List of medieval universities
 List of oldest institutions in continuous operation

References

Notes

Citations 

Lists of universities and colleges
 
Lists of education-related superlatives
Oldest things